Días de poder is a 2011 film directed by Venezuelan director Román Chalbaud.

Plot 
The film follows revolutionary leader Fernando Quintero who, after the fall of the dictatorship of Marcos Pérez Jiménez, rises to power. His son Efraín, inherits his old convictions and becomes an active opponent of the government and his own father.

Cast

Reception 
Venezuelan film critic Sergio Monsalve said that the movie, along with Chalbaud's late work El Caracazo, Zamora: Tierra y hombres libres and La planta insolente tarnished Chalbaud's career and accomplishments as a filmmaker, saying that they were produced to please the Bolivarian Revolution and the ruling party.

References

External links 

 
 Días de poder in FilmAffinity

2010s Spanish-language films
2011 films
Films set in the 1960s
Films directed by Román Chalbaud
Venezuelan drama films